The Kroombit Dam is a roller compacted concrete dam, built to replenish the groundwater supply to the Callide Irrigation area. The dam has a maximum height of 25m and used 275,000m³ of zoned earthfill and 100,000m³ of RCC and conventional concrete.

SunWater is undertaking a dam spillway capacity upgrade program to ensure the highest level of safety for our dams is maintained. The spillway will be upgraded in the longer term.

See also

List of dams and reservoirs in Australia

References

Reservoirs in Queensland
Central Queensland
Dams in Queensland